Bagtash (also Romanized as Bagtāsh; also known as Bailāsh and Baktāsh) is a city in, and the capital of, Baktash District of Miandoab County, West Azerbaijan province, Iran. At the 2006 census, its population was 3,198 in 756 households, when it was a village in the Central District. The following census in 2011 counted 3,525 people in 984 households. The latest census in 2016 showed a population of 3,523 people in 1,065 households; it was the largest village in its rural district.

After the census, the rural district was separated from the Central District, elevated to the status of Baktash District, divided into two rural districts, and the village of Bagtash upgraded to city status as capital of the new district.

References 

Miandoab County

Cities in West Azerbaijan Province

Populated places in West Azerbaijan Province

Populated places in Miandoab County